Alexandra Margaret "Ali" DeLoof is an American swimmer specializing in backstroke. She is the world record holder in the 4×50 m medley relay. During the 2016 FINA Short Course Worlds in Windsor, Ontario, Canada, she won gold medals in the 4x50  and 4x100 metres medley relays, and won a gold medal as a prelim swimmer in the 4x100 metres freestyle relay. She also won bronze in the 50 metres backstroke, and placed sixth in the 100 metres backstroke.

References

1994 births
Living people
American female backstroke swimmers
Medalists at the FINA World Swimming Championships (25 m)
Pan American Games medalists in swimming
Pan American Games gold medalists for the United States
Swimmers at the 2019 Pan American Games
Universiade medalists in swimming
Universiade gold medalists for the United States
Universiade silver medalists for the United States
Medalists at the 2017 Summer Universiade
Medalists at the 2019 Pan American Games
Michigan Wolverines women's swimmers
21st-century American women